Batuecas may refer to:

Tomas Batuecas (1893–1972), Spanish chemist
Las Batuecas, a valley and a river in the province of Salamanca, Castile and León, Spain
Natural Park of Las Batuecas, Sierra de Francais, a natural area of the province of Salamanca, Castile and León, Spain